The Swiss constituency is a voting group within the International Monetary Fund and the World Bank composed of Switzerland, Azerbaijan, Kazakhstan, Kyrgyzstan, Poland, Serbia, Tajikistan, Turkmenistan, and Uzbekistan.

References 

International Monetary Fund